Ludovica (minor planet designation: 292 Ludovica) is a Main belt asteroid.

It was discovered by Johann Palisa on 25 April 1890 in Vienna.

References

External links
 
 

Background asteroids
Ludovica
Ludovica
S-type asteroids
18900425